The International Open University (IOU) is a private distance education university headquartered in Kanifing, The Gambia. It was founded as the Islamic Online University by Bilal Philips in 2007 and offers undergraduate and graduate degrees.

History
The university was Ilinitially established in 2001, but temporarily ceased operations. In April 2007, it reopened under the name Islamic Online University with a greater offering of completely free short courses. On January 13, 2020, it was announced  that the institution's name has been changed to the International Open University.

Ernest Bai Koroma, the chancellor of the University of Sierra Leone (USL) welcomed the idea of establishing the IOU type Islamic institution. In 2014, the Niger State Government paid the International Open University's Bachelor of Arts school fees for 35 students that registered from the state.

As of 2018, the International Open University is amongst the most ethnically diverse universities in the world.

In 2018, the International Open University's programs were ranked among the six best online Middle Eastern Studies programs by Successful Student, although by June 2020 they had been removed from this list.

In 2021, the  online Kenyan newspaper Tuko ranked the International Open University among the top accredited distance learning universities in Africa, along with the University of Johannesburg, the University of Zambia, the University of South Africa , the University of Nairobi and the University of Pretoria, in addition to  few other universities.

In November 2022, the IOU Chancellor Dr. Bilal Philips paid a courtesy visit to Adama Barrow, the President of the Gambia, and offered scholarships worth USD 4,000,000 for education of underprivileged Gambians at the International Open University.

Affiliations
The International Open University is a full member of Association of African Universities, approved member of International Council for Open and Distance Education, African Quality Assurance Network (AfriQAN), Association of Quality Assurance Agencies of the Islamic World (IQA), associate member of International Network for Quality Assurance Agencies in Higher Education (INQAAHE), Asian Association of Open Universities, as well as a member of International Council of Islamic Finance Educators (ICIFE) and a member of the  Talloires Network.

Research
The International Open University launched a multidisciplinary peer-reviewed journal, Journal of Integrated Sciences,   in 2019.

Professor Dr. G. Hussein Rassool, the dean for the Faculty of Liberal Arts and Sciences, head of the Department of Psychology, Director of Research and Publications and Professor of Islamic Psychology at the International Open University is editor-in-chief of the journal.

Community service
The International Open University has set a mandatory community service for the students as a part of graduation requirements. In order to graduate, in addition to academic requirements, students are mandated to complete 216 hours of community service.

References

External links
 International Open University 
 Global Qur'an Memorization Center

Islamic universities and colleges
Educational institutions established in 2001
Online colleges
Distance education institutions based in the Gambia
2001 establishments in the Gambia